Carioca is a name for the inhabitants of Rio de Janeiro.

Carioca may also refer to:

People
 Tahiya Carioca (1925-1999), Egyptian actress and dancer
 Marcelinho Carioca (born 1971), born Marcelo Pereira Surcin, Brazilian football attacking midfielder
 Carioca (footballer, born 1974), born Alexander Antonio Viana, Brazilian football forward
 Jean Carioca (footballer, born 1978), born Jean da Silva Duarte, Brazilian football defender
 Carioca (footballer, born 1979), born Claudio Silva da Fonseca, Brazilian football midfielder
 Rafael Carioca (footballer, born 1986), born Rafael Felipe Barreto, Brazilian football midfielder
 Jean Carioca (footballer, born 1988), born Jean Agostinho da Silva, Brazilian football midfielder
 Rafael Carioca (born 1989), born Rafael de Souza Pereira,  Brazilian football defensive midfielder
 Rafael Carioca (footballer, born 1992), born Rafael Bruno Cajueiro da Silva, Brazilian leftback
 Marquinhos Carioca (born 1992), born Marcus Vinícius Vidal Cunha, Brazilian football winger
 Diego Carioca (born 1998), born Diego Silva Nascimento Santos, Brazilian football midfielder
 Elias Carioca (born 1999), born Elias Rezende de Oliveira, Brazilian football forward

Music
 Os Cariocas, a Brazilian popular music group
 "Carioca" (1933 song), a song and a dance from the 1933 film Flying Down to Rio
Carioca (Raphael Gualazzi song), 2020

Places
 Carioca/Sugar Loaf field, a Brazilian oil field
 Carioca Aqueduct, an 18th-century Aqueduct in Rio
 Carioca Station, a station on the Rio de Janeiro Metro

Others
 Carioca (food) (also known as pinakufu or paborot), fried dessert from the Philippines made from glazed ground glutinous rice balls
 Volvo PV 36 Carioca
 José Carioca, a Disney character
 Carioca (card game), a card game similar to rummy style games

See also